The Dicteriadidae are a small family of damselflies with only two species in two monotypic genera. The family is endemic to South America.

Species:
Dicterias atrosanguinea – Red Bareleg: endemic to Brazil
Heliocharis amazona – widely distributed in South America

References

Calopterygoidea
Odonata families